You Have Already Gone to the Other World is A Hawk and a Hacksaw's sixth studio album with the subtitle "Music inspired by Paradjanov's Shadows of Forgotten Ancestors". It is a concept album which is written as a retrospective soundtrack for the 1964 movie Shadows of Forgotten Ancestors by Sergei Parajanov.

Background
The album is a concept album, it is arranged as a soundtrack for an already existing movie. Eight tracks are Eastern Europe folk songs from Hungary, Ukraine and Romania which are partly sampled from the movie and newly interpreted and arranged by Barnes and Trost. They also composed new music for the movie and played live along the movie in cinemas and theatres in 2012.

Track listing

Personnel
Jeremy Barnes - accordion
Heather Trost - violin
John Dieterich - featuring on tracks 2,5 and 7
John Dieterich, Griffin Rodriguez and Jeremy Barnes - recording
Billy Joe Miller - album photography

Samples
 All traditional songs arranged by Barnes and Trost
 Samples from Sergei Parajanov's Shadows of Forgotten Ancestors on tracks 1, 2, 4, 10 and 15:
(1) Open It, Rose (Hungary) sample at 01:16 in the movie
(2) You Have Already Gone to the Other World
(4) Wedding Theme (Ukraine) sample at 52:33 in the movie
(10) Horses of Fire Rachenitsa
(15) Ivan and Marichka / The Sorcerer sample at 46:15 in the movie
 An unknown Hungarian on track 14 "Oh, Lord, Saint George, Bewitch Ivan, Make Him Mine"

Notes

External links
The album - You Have Already Gone to the Other World
A Hawk And A Hacksaw
The movie - Shadows Of Forgotten Ancestors
Shadows of Forgotten Ancestors at the Internet Movie Database
 Parajanov.com News
Shadows of Forgotten Ancestors at Parajanov.com
Shadows of Forgotten Ancestors on YouTube (full length)

References

2013 albums
A Hawk and a Hacksaw albums